Piseco Outlet drains Piseco Lake  and converges with the West Branch Sacandaga River in Piseco, New York. From the outlet of Piseco Lake to the creeks mouth it only drops  in elevation.

References 

Rivers of Hamilton County, New York
Tributaries of the Sacandaga River